Saks Fifth Avenue (originally Saks & Company; colloquially Saks) is an American luxury department store chain headquartered in New York City and founded by Andrew Saks. The original store opened in the F Street shopping district of Washington, D.C. in 1867. Saks expanded into Manhattan with its Herald Square store in 1902 and flagship store on Fifth Avenue in 1924. The chain was acquired by Tennessee-based Proffitt's, Inc. (renamed Saks, Inc.) in 1998, and Saks, Inc. was acquired by the Canadian-based Hudson's Bay Company (HBC) in 2013.

Subsidiary Saks Off 5th, originally a clearance store for Saks Fifth Avenue, is now a large off-price retailer in its own right managed independently from Saks Fifth Avenue under HBC.

History

Early history 

Andrew Saks was born to a German Jewish family, in Baltimore, Maryland. He worked as a peddler and paper boy before moving to Washington, D.C. where at the age of only 20, and in the still-chaotic and tough economic times of 1867, only two years after the United States prevailed in the American Civil War, he established a men's clothing store with his brother Isadore. A. Saks & Co. occupied a storefront in the Avenue House Hotel building at 517 (300-308) 7th Street, N.W., in what is still Washington's downtown shopping district. Saks offered his goods at one price only, no bargaining, and offered refunds on merchandise returns, neither of which were the more common practice at that place and time. Saks was also known for its "forceful and interesting, but strictly truthful" newspaper advertising, according to the Washington Evening Star, including a two-page spread, large for that time, in that newspaper on April 4, 1898. Saks annexed the store next door, and in 1887 started building a large new store on the site of the old Avenue Hotel Building at 7th and Market Space (now United States Navy Memorial Plaza).

In 1896 Saks opened a branch store in Indianapolis in Ingall's Block, which was a success. then they expanded to Norfolk, Virginia, and by 1897 had six stores: Washington, D.C., Richmond, Virginia, Norfolk, Virginia, Indianapolis, and two stores as well as a clothing factory in New York City. Saks called itself "Washington's Wonderful Store".

20th century 
Saks opened a very large store in 1902 in New York City's Herald Square on 34th Street and Broadway. Andrew Saks ran the New York store as a family affair with his brother Isadore, and his sons Horace and William. Andrew Saks died in 1912 and his son Horace took over the company's management.

In 1923, Saks & Co. merged with Gimbel Brothers, Inc., which was owned by a cousin of Horace Saks, Bernard Gimbel, operating as a separate autonomous subsidiary.  On September 15, 1924, Horace Saks and Bernard Gimbel opened in the Saks Fifth Avenue Building at 611 Fifth Avenue, with a full-block avenue frontage south of St. Patrick's Cathedral, facing what would become Rockefeller Center. The architects were Starrett & van Vleck, who developed a design derived from classical architecture.

When Bernard's cousin, Adam Gimbel, became president of Saks Fifth Avenue in 1926 after Horace Saks's sudden death, the company expanded, opening seasonal resort branches in Palm Beach, Florida, and Southampton, New York, in 1928. The first full-line year-round Saks store opened in Chicago, in 1929, followed by another resort store in Miami Beach, Florida. In 1938, Saks expanded to the West Coast, opening in Beverly Hills, California. By the end of the 1930s, Saks Fifth Avenue had a total of 10 stores, including resort locations such as Sun Valley, Idaho, Mount Stowe, and Newport, Rhode Island.  More full-line stores followed with Detroit, Michigan, in 1940 and Pittsburgh, Pennsylvania, in 1949. In Downtown Pittsburgh, the company moved to its own freestanding location approximately one block from its former home on the fourth floor in the downtown Gimbel's flagship. The San Francisco location opened in 1952, competing locally with I. Magnin. BATUS Inc. acquired Gimbel Bros., Inc. and its Saks Fifth Avenue subsidiary in 1973 as part of its diversification strategy. More expansion followed from the 1960s through the 1990s including the Midwest, and the South, particularly in Texas. In 1990, BATUS sold Saks to Investcorp S.A., which took Saks public in 1996 as Saks Holdings, Inc.

In 1990, the company launched "Saks Off 5th", an outlet store offshoot of the main brand, with 107 stores worldwide by 2016.

In 1998, Proffitt's, Inc. the parent company of Proffitt's and other department stores, acquired Saks Holdings Inc.  Upon completing the acquisition, Proffitt's, Inc. changed its name to Saks, Inc.

21st century 
In November 2001 the first Middle Eastern store opened at Kingdom Centre in Riyadh, Saudi Arabia.

In August 2007, the United States Postal Service began an experimental program selling the plus ZIP code extension to businesses.  The first company to do so was Saks Fifth Avenue, which received the ZIP code of 10022-7463 ("SHOE", on a U.S. touch-tone keypad) for the eighth-floor shoe department in its flagship Fifth Avenue store.

The first Mexican store opened at the Centro Comercial Santa Fe in Mexico City, Mexico in November of 2007. Another store opened at Plaza Carso in 2010 this store closed in October 2020. 

Saks opened a location at the City Centre Mall in Manama, Bahrain in 2008, the store has two floors and is 57,000 square feet and was the third store opened in the Middle East and is currently the only Saks store in the Middle East.

During the 2007–2009 recession, Saks Fifth Avenue had to cut prices and profit margins, thus according to Reuters "training shoppers to expect discounts. It took three years before it could start selling at closer to full price". 

A new international store opened in Almaty, Kazakhstan at 3 floors tall and 91,000 square feet the store is located at the Esenati Shopping Mall and licensed by the VILED Group, it is still in operation as of 2022.

In 2012, the store in Riyadh owned by Prince Al Waleed bin Talal Al Saud closed after the licensing agreement expired in 2011.
 
As of 2013, the New York flagship store, whose real estate value was estimated between $800 million and over $1 billion at the time, generated around 20% of Saks' annual sales at $620 million, with other stores being less profitable according to analysts.

On July 29, 2013, the Hudson's Bay Company (HBC), the oldest commercial corporation in North America and owner of the competing chain Lord & Taylor, announced it would acquire Saks Fifth Avenue's parent company for US$2.9 billion. Plans called for up to seven Saks Fifth Avenues to open in major Canadian markets. In January 2014, HBC announced the first Saks store in Canada would occupy  in its flagship Queen Street building in downtown Toronto, connected to the Toronto Eaton Centre via sky bridge. The store opened in February 2016 with a second Toronto area location in the Sherway Gardens shopping center opening in spring 2016. On February 22, 2018, Saks Fifth Avenue opened its third Canadian store in Calgary, Alberta. 

In 2015 Saks began a $250 million, three-year restoration of its Fifth Avenue flagship store. In October 2015, Saks announced a new location in Greenwich, Connecticut. In autumn 2015, Saks announced it would replace its existing store at the Houston Galleria with a new store. 

On August 31, 2016 the 80,000 square foot store at the BurJuman Centre in Dubai closed after being open since 2005, the store was Saks last store in the UAE after failed attempts at expansion.

On Friday, January 15, 2021, Saks Fifth Avenue unveiled a 54,000-square-foot space on the fifth floor of its flagship in New York, titled Barneys at Saks. The collaboration is aimed at continuing Barneys New York tradition of unearthing and promoting emerging designers.

On Monday, January 25, 2021, Saks Fifth Avenue unveiled the first standalone Barneys at Saks store in a 14,000-square-foot location in Greenwich, Connecticut. This marked the first time Saks has offered men’s merchandise in the Greenwich market.

In August 2021, Saks Fifth Avenue announced that it would be teaming up with WeWork to open new co-working locations.

In 2021, Saks announced that it would close all 27 of its fur salons, including those located in New York, Boston, Philadelphia and Beverly Hills, by the end of January 2022. The company also said it would stop both online and in-store sales of products made from animals raised for their fur or those made with fur from wild animals by January 2023.

In 2022, Sansborn Group decided to close the last remaining store in Mexico in Santa Fe and that Sears Mexico will replace the store keeping the current staff.

Legal controversies 
In 2005, vendors filed against Saks alleging unlawful chargebacks. The U.S. Securities and Exchange Commission (SEC) investigated the complaint for years and, according to the New York Times, "exposed a tangle of illicit tactics that let Saks... keep money it owed to clothing makers", inflating Saks' yearly earnings up to 43% and abusively collecting around $30 million from suppliers over seven years. Saks settled with the SEC in 2007, after firing three or more executives involved in the fraudulent activities.

In 2014, Saks fired transgender employee Leyth Jamal after she was allegedly "belittled by coworkers, forced to use the men's room and repeatedly referred to by male pronouns (he and him)". After Jamal submitted a lawsuit for unfair dismissal, the company stated in a motion to dismiss that "it is well settled that transsexuals are not protected by Title VII of the Civil Rights Act of 1964." In a court filing, the United States Department of Justice rebuked Saks' argument, stating that "discrimination against an individual based on gender identity is discrimination because of sex." The Human Rights Campaign removed the company from its list of "allies" during the controversy. The lawsuit was later settled amicably, with undisclosed terms.

In 2017, following the events of Hurricane Maria in Puerto Rico, Saks's San Juan store in Mall of San Juan suffered major damages along with its neighboring anchor store Nordstrom. Taubman Centers, the company which owns the mall, filed a lawsuit against Saks for failing to provide an estimated reopening date and failing to restore damages after the hurricane due to a binding contract. Although Nordstrom reopened on November 9, 2018, Saks Fifth Avenue vacated The Mall of San Juan after two years of ligitation.

Notable locations

Saks–34th Street 

Saks-34th Street was a fashion-focused middle market department store at 1293-1311 Broadway on Herald Square. The building, built in 1902, had seven stories and was designed by Buchman & Fox. The store was spun off from Saks & Company when that upscale retailer moved to Fifth Avenue, a location that Saks Fifth Avenue maintains to this day. The newly renamed Saks-34th Street was sold to Bernard F. Gimbel, and became a part of the New York division of Gimbels (later Manhattan Mall), and a sky bridge across 33rd Street connected the second floors of both flagship buildings. In the 1947 movie Miracle on 34th Street the facade of Saks-34th Street is shown in a scene that focuses on the Gimbel's flagship store.  Branch locations were opened around the greater New York area. The store closed in 1965, citing poor layouts, no escalators, a confused identity, and outdated facade. After Gimbels decided to close the division, the first floor of the building was used as a Christmas season annex for Gimbel's before being sold to the E. J. Korvettes chain. After the demise of the Korvette's chain the building was remodeled into the Herald Center, in 1985.  the primary tenant is H&M, following another remodel.

Beverly Hills 

The Saks Fifth Avenue store on Wilshire Boulevard in Beverly Hills, California, was designed by the architectural firm Parkinson and Parkinson, with interiors by Paul R. Williams. The store opened in 1938. The store was immediately successful upon opening and it would subsequently expand to almost  and employ 500 people. Williams created an interior reminiscent of his designs for luxurious private residences, with rooms lit by indirect lamps and footlights focused on the clothes. New departments for furs, corsets, gifts and debutante dresses were added in the 1940 expansion.

Gallery

References

External links 

 Official website

Department stores of the United States